The 1976 United States Senate election in Virginia was held on November 2, 1976. Incumbent Senator Harry F. Byrd Jr. was re-elected to a second term over retired Admiral Elmo Zumwalt and state legislator Martin H. Perper. As of 2022, this is the last statewide race in Virginia that was won by an independent.

Candidates
Harry F. Byrd Jr. (I), incumbent U.S. Senator
Elmo Zumwalt (D), former Naval officer and Chief of Naval Operations
Martin H. Perper (I), former Republican member of Virginia state legislature

Results

See also 
 1976 United States Senate elections

References

United States Senate
Virginia
1976